The 1930–31 Philadelphia Quakers season was the Quakers' sole season in the National Hockey League (NHL). The team moved from Pittsburgh, where they had played as the Pittsburgh Pirates since 1925.

Offseason
The team relocated to Philadelphia and was in the charge of Benny Leonard, the prizefighter who held the world lightweight title from 1917 to 1925.

On October 18, 1930, 13 players, including player-coach Frank Fredrickson, were transferred to the Quakers from Pittsburgh. But Fredrickson was released two days later and replaced by Cooper Smeaton, who resigned his position as the league’s referee-in-chief to become the Quakers head coach.

Regular season
The team finished with 12 points for the season, the worst performance in the six-year history of the Pirate/Quaker franchise. The team lost $100,000 on its operations and folded after the season.  As a result, Philadelphia was left without an NHL franchise until the Flyers arrived in 1967.

Season standings

Record vs. opponents

Schedule and results

Regular season

|- style="background:#fcf;"
| 1 || November 11 || New York Rangers || 0–3 ||  || Miller || 5,000 || 0–1–0 || 0 || 
|- style="background:#fcf;"
| 2 || November 15 || @ Toronto Maple Leafs || 0–4 ||  || Miller || 6,000 || 0–2–0 || 0 || 
|- style="background:#fcf;"
| 3 || November 16 || @ Detroit Falcons || 1–5 ||  || Miller || 7,500 || 0–3–0 || 0 || 
|- style="background:#ffc;"
| 4 || November 18 || Ottawa Senators || 2–2 || OT || Miller || 2,000 || 0–3–1 || 1 || 
|- style="background:#fcf;"
| 5 || November 23 || @ New York Rangers || 2–5 ||  || Miller || 9,000 || 0–4–1 || 1 || 
|- style="background:#cfc;"
| 6 || November 25 || Toronto Maple Leafs || 2–1 ||  || Miller || 3,500 || 1–4–1 || 3 || 
|- style="background:#fcf;"
| 7 || November 29 || New York Rangers || 3–6 ||  || Miller || 2,500 || 1–5–1 || 3 || 
|-

|- style="background:#fcf;"
| 8 || December 2 || Montreal Canadiens  || 0–2 ||  || Miller || 4,000 || 1–6–1 || 3 || 
|- style="background:#fcf;"
| 9 || December 4 || @ Ottawa Senators || 2–5 ||  || Miller || 4,000 || 1–7–1 || 3 || 
|- style="background:#fcf;"
| 10 || December 6 || Boston Bruins || 3–4 ||  || Miller || 5,000 || 1–8–1 || 3 || 
|- style="background:#fcf;"
| 11 || December 9 || New York Americans  || 1–2 || OT || Miller || 3,000 || 1–9–1 || 3 || 
|- style="background:#fcf;"
| 12 || December 13 || Detroit Falcons || 2–3 ||  || Miller || 5,000 || 1–10–1 || 3 || 
|- style="background:#fcf;"
| 13 || December 16 || @ New York Americans || 0–3 ||  || Miller || 5,000 || 1–11–1 || 3 || 
|- style="background:#fcf;"
| 14 || December 20 || @ Montreal Maroons || 1–5 ||  || Miller || 9,000 || 1–12–1 || 3 || 
|- style="background:#fcf;"
| 15 || December 23 || Chicago Blackhawks || 2–3 ||  || Cude || 2,000 || 1–13–1 || 3 || 
|- style="background:#fcf;"
| 16 || December 25 || @ Boston Bruins || 0–8 ||  || Cude || 11,000 || 1–14–1 || 3 || 
|- style="background:#fcf;"
| 17 || December 28 || @ New York Rangers || 2–4 ||  || Cude || 7,000 || 1–15–1 || 3 || 
|-

|- style="background:#fcf;"
| 18 || January 1 || @ Chicago Black Hawks || 3–10 ||  || Cude || 7,000 || 1–16–1 || 3 || 
|- style="background:#fcf;"  
| 19 || January 3 || Ottawa Senators || 4–5 || OT || Cude || 3,500 || 1–17–1 || 3 || 
|- style="background:#fcf;"
| 20 || January 4 || @ New York Americans || 0–5 ||  || Cude || 7,000 || 1–18–1 || 3 || 
|- style="background:#fcf;"
| 21 || January 8 || Chicago Black Hawks || 0–4 ||  || Cude || n/a || 1–19–1 || 3 || 
|- style="background:#cfc;"
| 22 || January 10 || Montreal Maroons || 4–3 || OT || Miller || 3,000 || 2–19–1 || 5 || 
|- style="background:#fcf;"
| 23 || January 13 || Montreal Canadiens || 1–2 ||  || Forbes || 3,500 || 2–20–1 || 5 || 
|- style="background:#fcf;"
| 24 || January 17 || Detroit Falcons || 2–5 ||  || Forbes || 2,500 || 2–21–1 || 5 || 
|- style="background:#fcf;"
| 25 || January 20 || @ Detroit Falcons || 2–5 ||  || Cude || 6,000 || 2–22–1 || 5 || 
|- style="background:#fcf;"
| 26 || January 22 || @ Chicago Black Hawks || 2–5 ||  || Cude || 6,500 || 2–23–1 || 5 || 
|- style="background:#fcf;"
| 27 || January 24 || Boston Bruins || 2–4 ||  || Cude || 3,500 || 2–24–1 || 5 || 
|- style="background:#ffc;"
| 28 || January 27 || @ Boston Bruins || 3–3 || OT || Cude || n/a || 2–24–2 || 6 || 
|- style="background:#fcf;"
| 29 || January 29 || @ Montreal Canadiens || 1–7 ||  || Cude || 10,000 || 2–25–2 || 6 || 
|- style="background:#fcf;"
| 30 || January 31 || @ Toronto Maple Leafs || 2–3 ||  || Cude || 7,000 || 2–26–2 || 6 || 
|-

|- style="background:#fcf;"
| 31 || February 5 || @ Chicago Black Hawks || 1–6 ||  || Cude || 8,000 || 2–27–2 || 6 || 
|- style="background:#fcf;"
| 32 || February 10 || New York Rangers || 1–3 ||  || Cude || n/a || 2–28–2 || 6 || 
|- style="background:#ffc;"
| 33 || February 14 || New York Americans || 1–1 || OT || Cude || 3,000 || 2–28–3 || 7 || 
|- style="background:#cfc;"
| 34 || February 17 || @ Detroit Falcons || 2–0 ||  || Cude || 5,000 || 3–28–3 || 9 || 
|- style="background:#fcf;"
| 35 || February 22 || @ New York Rangers || 1–6 ||  || Cude || 8,000 || 3–29–3 || 9 || 
|- style="background:#fcf;"
| 36 || February 24 || Boston Bruins || 1–5 ||  || Cude || 2,000 || 3–30–3 || 9 || 
|- style="background:#fcf;"
| 37 || February 28 || @ Montreal Maroons || 1–4 ||  || Cude || 9,500 || 3–31–3 || 9 || 
|-

|- style="background:#fcf;"
| 38 || March 3 || Toronto Maple Leafs || 1–5 ||  || Cude || 1,500 || 3–32–3 || 9 || 
|- style="background:#fcf;"
| 39 || March 7 || @ Boston Bruins || 2–7 ||  || Cude || n/a || 3–33–3 || 9 || 
|- style="background:#fcf;"
| 40 || March 10 || @ Ottawa Senators || 3–5 || OT || Cude || 2,000 || 3–34–3 || 9 || 
|- style="background:#cfc;"
| 41 || March 12 || Detroit Falcons || 7–5 ||  || Cude || n/a || 4–34–3 || 11 || 
|- style="background:#fcf;"
| 42 || March 14 || Montreal Maroons || 2–3 ||  || Cude || n/a || 4–35–3 || 11 || 
|- style="background:#fcf;"
| 43 || March 17 || Chicago Black Hawks || 0–4 ||  || Cude || 2,500 || 4–36–3 || 11 || 
|- style="background:#ffc;"
| 44 || March 21 || @ Montreal Canadiens || 4–4 ||  || Cude || n/a || 4–36–4 || 12 || 
|-

|-
| Legend:

Player statistics

Scoring
Position abbreviations: C = Center; D = Defense; F = Forward; G = Goaltender; LW = Left Wing; RW = Right Wing
 = Joined team via a transaction (e.g., trade, waivers, signing) during the season. Stats reflect time with the Quakers only.
 = Left team via a transaction (e.g., trade, waivers, release) during the season. Stats reflect time with the Quakers only.

Goaltending

Awards and records

Records
The 1930–31 Quakers are tied with the 1919–20 Quebec Bulldogs for the fewest wins in a season with four, though Quebec played 20 fewer games. The Quakers .136 points percentage on the season held the NHL record low for 44 years until being surpassed by the expansion 1974–75 Washington Capitals’ .131.

Transactions

The Quakers were involved in the following transactions before, during, and after the 1930–31 season.

Trades

Players acquired

Players lost

Signings

Notes

References
General
 
 
 
 
Specific

Philadelphia Quakers (NHL)
Pittsburgh Pirates (NHL) seasons
Philadelphia
Philadelphia